Pleasant Bay is a bay in Washington County, Maine, at the mouth of the Pleasant River.

Located between the towns of Addison and Harrington, on the east it is bordered by Cape Split and on the west it is separated from Harrington Bay by Ripley Neck, and from Narraguagus Bay by Dyer Island.
The bay extends roughly 6 mi. (10 km) and is 2.5 mi. (4 km) at its widest. The Nash Island Light is located on Nash Island at the entrance to the bay.

Bays of Washington County, Maine
Bays of Maine